Anarhichadidae, the wolffishes, sea wolves or wolf eels, is a family of marine ray finned fishes belonging to the order Scorpaeniformes. These are predatory, eel shaped fishes which are native to the cold waters of the Arctic, North Pacific and North Atlantic Oceans.

Taxonomy
Anarhichadidae was first proposed as a family in 1832 by the French zoologist Charles Lucien Bonaparte. The 5th edition of Fishes of the World classifies this family within the suborder Zoarcoidei, within the order Scorpaeniformes. Other authorities classify this family in the infraorder Zoarcales wihin the suborder Cottoidei of the Perciformes because removing the Scorpaeniformes from the Perciformes renders that taxon non monophyletic.

Etymology
Anarhichadidae is derived from the name of its type genus Anarhichas which is an Ancient Greek name for the Atlantic wolffish (A. lupus) and means "the climber", in turn derived from the Greek genital which means "to climb or scramble up". This may be an allusion to the ancient belief that wolffishes left the water and climbed up on the rocks.

Genera and species
Anarhichadidae contains two genera and five species:

Timeline of genera

Characteristics
Anarhichadidae wolfishes have a largely compressed and, in the genus Anarhichas, a moderately elongate body. Anarrhichthys has an extremely elongate body and this has given rise to its common name of wolf-eel. The long dorsal fin starts at the head and has many flexible spines and soft rays. The anal fin may have a single spine in Anarrhichthys, and again there is a large number of soft rays. The caudal fin is separate from the other median fins in Anarhichas but they are all three joined in Anarrhichthys. There is a single pair of nostrils. The scales, if present, are cycloid, tiny and do not overlap. There are well developed. movement sensitive sensory canals on the head and as the fish ages the pores grow vey large. There are 1 or 2 lateral lines made up of superficial neuromasts. There are robust conical teeth in the front of the jaws and large molar like teeth to the rear of those. The gill membranes are joined to the isthmus and the gill openings are set widely apart. There is no swim bladder. The counts of vertebrae are 72–89 in Anarhichas and 221–251 in Anarrhichthys.

Distribution and habitat
Anarhichadidae wolfishes prefer cooler waters and are found in the northern parts of the North Pacific and North Atlantic Oceans as well as in the Arctic Ocean. They are demersal fishes occurring in shallow to moderately deep and cold seas.

Biology
Anarhichadidae wolffishes use their large teeth to feed on a diet of shelled invertebrates such as crabs, starfishes and sea urchins, as well as other prey, The peak mating season for wolffish is September to October. The male wolffish will guard the eggs 3–9 months until they hatch.

Fisheries
Anarhichadidae wolffishes, in particular two Atlantic species, the spotted wolffish and the Atlantic wolffish, are targeted by commercial fisheries. The flesh is used for food and the skin to make leather.

References

 
 
“The Wolffishes (Family : Anarhichadidae).” Finfish Aquaculture Diversification, by R. Le François Nathalie, CABI, 2010, pp. 417–418.

 
Zoarcoidei
Articles which contain graphical timelines
Taxa named by Charles Lucien Bonaparte
Ray-finned fish families